Oloosson was a town and polis (city-state) of Perrhaebia in ancient Thessaly near Elone and Gonnus, mentioned in the Catalogue of Ships in the Iliad by Homer, who gives to it the epithet of “white,” from its white argillaceous soil. In Procopius the name occurs in the corrupt form of Lossonus.

Several Greek inscriptions have been found concerning the city of Oloosson. In a votive inscription from the first half of the fourth century BCE that is dedicated to Apollo Pythius are also the names of some people together with various demonyms from Perrhaebia. In another inscription dated in the 1st century BCE, election procedures of magistrates are mentioned.

Ancient Oloosson was located at a site called Panayia in the modern town of Elassona.

References

Populated places in ancient Thessaly
Former populated places in Greece
Locations in the Iliad
Perrhaebia
Cities in ancient Greece
Thessalian city-states